The River Fane is a river flowing from County Monaghan to Dundalk Bay in County Louth, Ireland.

Course

Originating in Lough Ross on the border of County Monaghan and County Armagh, and so of the Republic of Ireland and Northern Ireland, the Fane flows east towards Dundalk Bay, straddling the border between Counties Monaghan, Louth and Armagh flowing through Inniskeen, Knockbridge, before meeting Dundalk Bay near Blackrock, County Louth.

The Fane River is 38.25 miles long and drains an area of 350 km2

Water extraction
The Fane is, through the Cavan Hill pumping station, a major source of fresh water for Dundalk and the surrounding area in northern Louth.

Pollution
Runoff from illegal fuel laundering operations, carried out in the region, is a major source of polycyclic aromatic hydrocarbons which have severely affected Atlantic salmon stocks in the region.

See also
Rivers of Ireland

References

External links
Salmon fishing on the River Fane, from Salmon Ireland

Fane